Dan Jawitz (born 1960) is a South African film and television producer. He is the co-founder of Ice Media and he with Mark J Kaplan were both  producers on A Lion's Trail which won 27th annual News and documentary Emmy Award.

Career 

Jawitz started in the industry as a publicist on the film Kini and Adams which was selected for Official Competition at the Cannes Film Festival (1997) and nominated for a Palme d’Or.

In 2000, he launched Ice Media with Joel Phiri in Johannesburg. More than a decade later, Jawitz and Phiri reunited to form Known Associates Entertainment.

Previous partnerships include, Fireworx Media which Jawitz established in 2008 with Neil Brandt and Bridget Pickering. He managed thisproduction company as the Managing Director for 10 years, producing shows on South African television, including Keeping Score (Telenovela, SABC2) and Hustle (Drama, ETV).

In 2014 he co-produced One Humanity with Tony Hollingsworth, directed by Mickey Dube, which vividly brings to life the history of the international Anti-Apartheid Movement using music, archive and interview.

Other work 

Jawitz is the co-founder of SASFED, the South African Screen Federation and was a Distribution and Marketing Advisor to the South African National Film and Video Foundation from 2005 to 2014. He was also an Executive Committee member on the IPO Board for many years.

Accolades 

In 2005, Jawitz won an Emmy Award for A Lion's Trail for "Most Outstanding Cultural and Artistic Achievement".

References

South African film producers
1960 births
Living people